Somatic anxiety, also known as somatization, is the physical manifestation of anxiety. It is commonly contrasted with cognitive anxiety, which is the mental manifestation of anxiety, or the specific thought processes that occur during anxiety, such as concern or worry. These different components of anxiety are especially studied in sports psychology, specifically relating to how the anxiety symptoms affect athletic performance.

"Symptoms typically associated with somatization of anxiety and other psychiatric disorders include abdominal pain, dyspepsia, chest pain, fatigue, dizziness, insomnia, and headache." These symptoms can either happen alone or multiple can happen at once.

Although commonly overlooked, scientists are starting to study somatic anxiety more. Studies have shown that some medically overlooked cases that could not relate physical pain to any type of organ dysfunction typically could have been somatic anxiety.

Anxiety-performance relationship theories

Drive theory 

The Drive Theory (Zajonc 1965) suggests that if an athlete is both skilled and driven (by somatic and cognitive anxiety) then the athlete will perform well.

Inverted-U hypothesis 

The Inverted-U Hypothesis (Yerkes and Dodson, 1908), also known as the Yerkes-Dodson law (Yerkes 1908) hypothesizes that as somatic and cognitive anxiety (the arousal) increase, performance will increase until a certain point. Once the arousal has increased past this point, performance will decrease.

Multi-dimensional theory 
The Multi-dimensional Theory of Anxiety (Martens, 1990) is based on the distinction between somatic and cognitive anxiety. The theory predicts that there is a negative, linear relationship between somatic and cognitive anxiety, that there will be an Inverted-U relationship between somatic anxiety and performance, and that somatic anxiety should decline once performance begins although cognitive anxiety may remain high, if confidence is low.

Catastrophe theory
The Catastrophe Theory (Hardy, 1987) suggests that stress, combined with both somatic and cognitive anxiety, influences performance, that somatic anxiety will affect each athlete differently, and that performance will be affected uniquely, which will make it difficult to predict an outcome using general rules.

Optimum arousal theory 
The Optimum Arousal Theory (Hanin, 1997) states that each athlete will perform at their best if their level of anxiety falls within an "optimum functioning zone".

See also
 Somatic symptom disorder

References

Additional references
 

Anxiety
Somatic psychology